Douglas Buck is an American film director.

Buck grew up on Long Island, in New York State. He later moved to New York City, where he began making films while working as an airport electrical engineer.

Buck started by making short films, including Cutting Moments (1997), Home (1998), and Prologue (2003), all three of which were collected together in the Family Portraits anthology. Rue Morgue magazine selected Cutting Moments as one of its "100 Alternative Horror Films". In 2004 he began making a new version of Brian De Palma's 1973 film Sisters starring Lou Doillon, Stephen Rea and Chloë Sevigny, which was released in 2007, and described by Variety as "a worthy partner to his predecessor's famously violent slasher thriller". His 2008 eco-horror film The Broken Imago is influenced by the 1976 Spanish film Quién puede matar a un niño.

Buck also co-wrote the 1999 film Terror Firmer.

Filmography
Feature films
Family Portraits: A Trilogy of America (2003) 
Sisters (2006)

Short films
After All (1994)
Cutting Moments (1997) 
Home (1998) 
Prologue (2003) 
The Broken Imago (2008) 
The Aristofrogs (2010) 
The Accident (2011)

References

External links

 Interviews conducted February 24, 2008.

American film directors
Horror film directors
Living people
Year of birth missing (living people)